Ammavanu Pattiya Amali is a 1989 Indian Malayalam film, directed by Augustine Prakash, starring Mukesh and Thilakan in the lead roles.

Cast
 Mukesh as Suresh
 Thilakan as Sreedara menon
 KPAC Lalitha as Sethulakshmi
 T. G. Ravi as Narayanan
 Lizy as Sulojana
 Innocent as Ravunni
 Kuthiravattam Pappu as Kuttan Nair
 Lalu Alex as Sreenivasan
 Jagathy Sreekumar as Johnson
 Mala Aravindan Thomson
 Kundara Johnny as Vasu
 K. P. A. C. Sunny
 Unnimary as Barghavi
 Thodupuzha Vasanthi
 Aloor Elsy
 Disco Shanti
 Sugandhi

Soundtrack
The music was composed by A. T. Ummer and the lyrics were written by  M. D. Rajendran

References

External links
 

1989 films
1980s Malayalam-language films